EPBF may refer to:

 European Pocket Billiard Federation, the European governing body for pocket billiards.
 Electron-beam additive manufacturing, Electron-beam Powder Bed Fusion